Ka-Do-Ha Indian Village is a tourist attraction near Murfreesboro, Arkansas. The site may be a Late Caddo settlement, but has never been professionally excavated.

See also
 Caddo
 Murfreesboro, Arkansas

References

External links
 Caddoan Mounds State Historic Site
 The Encyclopedia of Arkansas History and Culture (The Caddo Indians)
 The Encyclopedia of Arkansas History and Culture (Indian Mounds)
 A History of the Caddo Indians

Caddoan Mississippian culture
Caddo
Arkansas culture
Roadside attractions in Arkansas